Instituto Español Lope de Vega is a Spanish international school in Nador, Morocco. Operated by the Spanish Ministry of Education, it serves infant education through bachillerato (senior high school/sixth form college).

The Grupo Escolar Lope de Vega was established in 1914 and established a girls' school division in 1917.

References

External links
  Instituto Español Lope de Vega
  Instituto Español Lope de Vega

Spanish international schools in Morocco
Nador
Educational institutions established in 1914
1914 establishments in Morocco
20th-century architecture in Morocco